The first season of the Saiyuki anime series, was directed by Yuto Date and produced by Studio Pierrot and Dentsu entitled . The series adapt Kazuya Minekura's manga, directed by Hayato Date, written by Katsuyuki Sumisawa and composed by Motoi Sakuraba.

The season follows the first adventures of Genjo Sanzo with three demons, named Son Goku, Cho Hakkai, and Sha Gojyo, travel to the west, are questing to put a stop to whoever's trying to resurrect the ancient and powerful demon god, Gyumao. Of course, there are armies of other demons just aching to get in the way.

The season initially ran from  April 4, 2000 to March 27, 2001 in Japan on TV Tokyo, spanning 50 episodes. Enoki Films holds the U.S. license to Gensomaden Saiyuki under the title Saiyuki: Paradise Raiders. Also ADV Films licensed the series, released in July 2003 to 2009.

Madman Entertainment announced its license of the series in October 2009 for Australasia. The episodes was released at a rate of one a day for all 50 episodes and will remain online until 20 January 2010.

Four pieces of theme music are used for the episodes—two opening themes and two ending themes. The first opening themes is "For Real" by Hidenori Tokuyama, used for the first twenty-six episodes and the second opening themes is "Still Time" by Hidenori Tokuyama used from episode twenty-seven to fifty. The two ending themes, "Tightrope" by Charcoal Filter and "Alone" by Mikuni Shimokawa.



Home media release

Japanese

References

External links
Official TV Tokyo Gensomaden Saiyuki website 

Saiyuki (manga)
Saiyuki